Bride 13 is a 1920 American silent adventure thriller film serial directed by Richard Stanton, and the first film serial made by Fox. It is considered to be a lost film. Bride 13 was promoted as romantic film.

Plot
A band of pirates operating from a submarine off the U.S. coast cause depredations, and thirteen young and beautiful brides from wealthy families disappear and are held for ransom for millions of dollars, requiring the assistance of the Department of Justice and the U.S. Navy.

Cast
 Marguerite Clayton as Bride 13
 John B. O'Brien as Lt. Bob Norton
 Gretchen Hartman as Zara
 Arthur Earle
 Lyster Chambers as Stephen Winthrop
 Mary Christensen
 Justine Holland as Bride 2
 Dorothy Langley as Bride 1
 Mary Ellen Capers as Bride 8
 Martha McKay as Bride 5
 Helen Johnson as Bride 6
 Leona Clayton as Bride 4
 Florence Mills as Bride 9
 W. E. Lawrence (as William Lawrence)

Production
Aiming to give the American public a sense of the importance of its warships and their operations, the U.S. Navy assisted in the production of the film by making its ships available. In addition to film of warships underway, scenes were filmed on board the destroyer USS Breckinridge (DD-148) and submarine USS R-1, and on seaplanes from the squadron assigned to the USS Shawmut (CM-4).

Promotion
From an ad for the film:
Do you want to be thrilled as you never have been thrilled since as a boy or girl you first read Jules Verne, Dumas, Poe or Conan Doyle?
If you do, don't miss the first or any succeeding episodes of BRIDE 13. Beginning with the abduction for ransom of wealthy brides by a cutthroat band of submarine pirates from Tripoli, carrying you from palatial homes to the sun-scorched sands of Northern Africa. Bride 13 piles crisis upon crisis, climax upon climax, thrill upon thrill.
Each episode leaves you feeling that you could not endure the excitement of another reel, yet in tremendous suspense to know what happens next.
So stupendous is the situation created by the plot of Bride 13 that it could only be solved by the most powerful actor in the world!
OUR NAVY, with its dreadnoughts, destroyers, submarines, seaplanes, blimps, officers and men, is one of the most important actors in Bride 13, through the special courtesy of the Government.
The fierce combats on sea and land, the pursuits by sea, air and land, and hundreds of other incidents are made absolutely realistic because enacted by genuine naval officers, sailors and marines."

Chapter titles
Snatched from the Altar
The Pirate's Fangs
The Craft of Despair#The Vulture's Prey
The Torture Chamber
The Tarantula's Trail
Tongues of Flame
Entombed
Hurled from the Clouds
The Cavern of Terror
Greyhounds of the Sea
The Creeping Peril
Reefs of Treachery
The Fiendish Tribesmen
Thundering Vengeance

See also
 List of film serials
 List of film serials by studio
 List of lost films

References
This article cites public domain text published in 1920, as referenced below.

External links

1920 films
1920 thriller films
American black-and-white films
American silent serial films
American thriller films
Lost American films
American romantic thriller films
1920 lost films
Films directed by Richard Stanton
1920s English-language films
1920s American films
Silent thriller films
Silent adventure films
American adventure films
Seafaring films
Submarine films